Poisonous material is a material, other than a gas, known to be so toxic to humans that it presents a health hazard during transportation.

Divisions

Division 6.1: Poisonous material is a material, other than a gas, which is known to be so toxic to humans as to afford a hazard to health during transportation, or which, in the absence of adequate data on human toxicity:

Is presumed to be toxic to humans because it falls within any one of the following categories when tested on laboratory animals (whenever possible, animal test data that has been reported in the chemical literature should be used):
Oral Toxicity: A liquid or solid with an LD50 for acute oral toxicity of not more than 300 mg/kg.
Dermal Toxicity. A material with an LD50 for acute dermal toxicity of not more than 1000 mg/kg.
Inhalation Toxicity: A dust or mist with an LC50 for acute toxicity on inhalation of not more than 4 mg/L; or a material with a saturated vapor concentration in air at 20 °C (68 °F) of more than one-fifth of the LC50 for acute toxicity on inhalation of vapors and with an LC50 for acute toxicity on inhalation of vapors of not more than 5000 mL/m3; or
Is an irritating material, with properties similar to tear gas, which causes extreme irritation, especially in confined spaces.

Division 6.2: Biohazards.

Placards

Poison: 454 kg (1001 lb) or more gross weight of poisonous materials that are not in Hazard Zone A or B (see Assignment of packing groups and hazard zones below). For U.S. Domestic Use only.
Inhalation Hazard: Any quantity of a material that is in Hazard Zone A or B (see Assignment of packing groups and hazard zones below).
Toxic: May be used instead of POISON placard on 454 kg (1001 lb) or more gross weight of poisonous materials that are not in Hazard Zone A or B (see Assignment of packing groups and hazard zones below). For international shipments the label must say Toxic if it will be worded.
PG III (Packing Group III): May be used instead of POISON placard on 454 kg (1001 lb) or more gross weight of Poison PG III materials (see Assignment of packing groups and hazard zones below).

Lethality

Lethal Dose 50

Oral Toxicity: LD50 for acute oral toxicity means that dose of the material administered to both male and female young adult albino rats which causes death within 14 days in half the animals tested. The number of animals tested must be sufficient to give statistically valid results and be in conformity with good pharmacological practices. The result is expressed in mg/kg body mass.
Dermal Toxicity: LD50 for acute dermal toxicity means that dose of the material which, administered by continuous contact for 24 hours with the shaved intact skin (avoiding abrading) of an albino rabbit, causes death within 14 days in half of the animals tested. The number of animals tested must be sufficient to give statistically valid results and be in conformity with good pharmacological practices. The result is expressed in mg/kg body mass.

Lethal Concentration 50

LC50 for acute toxicity on inhalation means that concentration of vapor, mist, or dust which, administered by continuous inhalation for one hour to both male and female young adult albino rats, causes death within 14 days in half of the animals tested. If the material is administered to the animals as a dust or mist, more than 90 percent of the particles available for inhalation in the test must have a diameter of 10 micrometres or less if it is reasonably foreseeable that such concentrations could be encountered by a human during transport. The result is expressed in mg/L of air for dusts and mists or in mL/m3 of air (parts per million) for vapors. See 49CFR 173.133(b) for LC50 determination for mixtures and for limit tests.

Compatibility table

Packing groups

References

49 CFR 173.132

Toxic and Infectious Substances